Dangi may be:
Dhanki language
Braj Bhasha